Lady Antonia Margaret Caroline Fraser,  ( Pakenham; born 27 August 1932) is a British author of history, novels, biographies and detective fiction. She is the widow of the 2005 Nobel Laureate in Literature, Harold Pinter (1930–2008), and prior to his death was also known as Lady Antonia Pinter.

Family background and education
Fraser is the first-born of the eight children of The 7th Earl of Longford (1905–2001) and his wife, Elizabeth, Countess of Longford, née Elizabeth Harman (1906–2002). As the daughter of an earl, she is accorded the courtesy title "Lady" and thus customarily addressed formally as "Lady Antonia".

As a teenager, she and her siblings converted to Catholicism, following the conversions of their parents. Her "maternal grandparents were Unitarians – a non-conformist faith with a strong emphasis on social reform". In response to criticism of her writing about Oliver Cromwell, she has said, "I have no Catholic blood". Before his own conversion in his thirties following a nervous breakdown in the Army, as she explains: "My father was Protestant Church of Ireland, and my mother was Unitarian up to the age of 20 when she abandoned it."

She was educated at the Dragon School in Oxford, St Mary's School, Ascot, and Lady Margaret Hall, Oxford; the last was also her mother's alma mater. Prior to going to Oxford in 1950, she was a debutante in the London social season.

Career
Fraser began work as an "all-purpose assistant" for George Weidenfeld at Weidenfeld & Nicolson (her "only job"), which later became her own publisher and part of Orion Publishing Group, which publishes her works in the UK.

Her first major work, published by Weidenfeld & Nicolson, was Mary, Queen of Scots (1969), which was followed by several other biographies, including Cromwell, Our Chief of Men (1973). Fraser won the Wolfson History Award in 1984 for The Weaker Vessel, a study of women's lives in 17th-century England. From 1988 to 1989, she was president of English PEN, and she chaired its Writers in Prison Committee.

She also has written detective novels, the most popular involving a character named Jemima Shore, and they were adapted into the television series Jemima Shore Investigates, which aired in the UK in 1983.

From 1983 to 1984, she was president of Edinburgh's Sir Walter Scott Club.

Fraser's study, The Warrior Queens (1989), is an account of military royal women since the days of Boadicea and Cleopatra. In 1992, a year after Alison Weir's book The Six Wives of Henry VIII, she published a book with the same title.

She chronicled the life and times of Charles II in a well-reviewed 1979 eponymous biography. The book was cited as an influence on the 2003 BBC/A&E mini-series, Charles II: The Power & the Passion, in a featurette on the DVD, by Rufus Sewell who played the title character. Fraser served as editor for many monarchical biographies, including those featured in the Kings and Queens of England and Royal History of England series, and, in 1996, she also published a book entitled The Gunpowder Plot: Terror and Faith in 1605, which won both the St. Louis Literary Award and the Crime Writers' Association (CWA) Non-Fiction Gold Dagger.

Her biography, Marie Antoinette: The Journey (2001, 2002), was adapted for the film Marie Antoinette (2006), directed by Sofia Coppola, with Kirsten Dunst in the title role, and Love and Louis XIV: The Women in the Life of the Sun King (2006).

Related experience
Fraser was a contestant on the BBC Radio 4 panel game My Word! from 1979 to 1990.

She serves as a judge for the Enid McLeod Literary Prize, awarded by the Franco-British Society, previously winning that prize for her biography Marie Antoinette (2001).

Lady Antonia Fraser is a Vice-President of The London Library.

Memoir
Fraser's memoir Must You Go? My Life with Harold Pinter was published in January 2010 and she read a shortened version as BBC Radio Four's Book of the Week that month.

At the Cheltenham Literary Festival on 17 October 2010, Lady Antonia announced that her next work would be on the subject of the Great Reform Bill 1832. She is no longer planning a biography of Queen Elizabeth I, as this subject has already been extensively covered.

Perspective and criticism
Fraser acknowledges she is "less interested in ideas than in 'the people who led nations' and so on. I don't think I could ever have written a history of political thought or anything like that. I'd have to come at it another way."

Marriages and later life
From 1956 until their divorce in 1977, she was married to Sir Hugh Fraser (1918–1984), a descendant of Scottish aristocracy 14 years her senior and a Roman Catholic Conservative Unionist MP in the House of Commons (sitting for Stafford), who was a friend of the American Kennedy family. They had six children: three sons, Benjamin, Damian, and Orlando; and three daughters, Rebecca Fraser, wife of barrister Edward Fitzgerald, QC, Flora Fraser and Natasha Fraser-Cavassoni. All three daughters are writers and biographers. Benjamin Fraser works for JPMorgan, Damian Fraser is the managing director of the investment banking firm UBS AG (formerly S.G. Warburg) in Mexico, and Orlando Fraser is a barrister specializing in commercial law (Wroe). Antonia Fraser has 18 grandchildren.

On 22 October 1975, Hugh and Antonia Fraser, together with Caroline Kennedy, who was visiting them at their Holland Park home, in Kensington, west London, were almost blown up by an IRA car bomb placed under the wheels of his Jaguar, which had been triggered to go off at 9 am when he left the house; the bomb exploded, killing the cancer researcher, Gordon Hamilton Fairley. Fairley, a neighbour of the Frasers, had been walking his dog, when he noticed something amiss and stopped to examine the bomb.

In 1975, she began an affair with playwright Harold Pinter, who was then married to the actress Vivien Merchant. In 1977, after she had been living with Pinter for two years, the Frasers' union was legally dissolved. Merchant spoke about her distress publicly to the press, which quoted her cutting remarks about her rival, but she resisted divorcing Pinter. In 1980, after Merchant signed divorce papers, Fraser and Pinter married. After the deaths of both their spouses, Fraser and Pinter were married by a Jesuit priest, Fr. Michael Campbell-Johnson, in the Roman Catholic Church. Harold Pinter died from cancer on 24 December 2008, aged 78.

Lady Antonia Fraser lives in the London district of Holland Park, in the Royal Borough of Kensington and Chelsea, south of Notting Hill Gate, in the Fraser family home, where she still writes in her fourth-floor study.

Lady Antonia Fraser is a Vice-President of the Royal Stuart Society.

Honours
Fraser was appointed Commander of the Order of the British Empire (CBE) in the 1999 Birthday Honours and promoted to Dame Commander of the Order of the British Empire (DBE) in the 2011 New Year Honours for services to literature. She was appointed a Member of the Order of the Companions of Honour (CH) in the 2018 New Year Honours for services to literature.

The Lady Antonia Fraser Archive in the British Library

Lady Antonia Fraser's uncatalogued papers (relating to her "Early Writing", "Fiction", and "Non-Fiction") are on loan at the British Library. Papers by and relating to Lady Antonia Fraser are also catalogued as part of the Harold Pinter Archive, which is part of its permanent collection of Additional Manuscripts.

Awards
 James Tait Black Memorial Prize (1969), for her book Mary, Queen of Scots.
 Wolfson History Prize (1984), for her book The Weaker Vessel.
 Crime Writers' Association Macallan Gold Dagger for Non-Fiction (1996), for her book The Gunpowder Plot.
 St. Louis Literary Award from the Saint Louis University Library Associates.
 Historical Association Norton Medlicott Medal (2000).
 Enid McLeod Literary Prize (2001), from the Franco-British Society, for Marie Antoinette.

Works

Non-fiction works
 Mary Queen of Scots (1969). .
 Reissued, Phoenix paperback, 2001; .
 40th-anniversary edition, reissued Orion paperback, 7 May 2009; .
 Dolls (1963)
 A History of Toys (1966)
 Cromwell, Our Chief of Men (1973);
 Also published as Cromwell: The Lord Protector.  .
 King James VI and I (1974)
 The Lives of the Kings and Queens of England (1975) [editor]
 King Charles II (1979)
 Also published as Royal Charles: Charles II and the Restoration and Charles II; .
 Heroes and Heroines (1980)
 The Weaker Vessel: Woman's Lot in Seventeenth-century England (1984)
 The Warrior Queens: Boadicea's Chariot (1988), Weidenfeld and Nicolson, London.
 Also published as Warrior Queens: The Legends and Lives of Women Who have led Their Nations in War.
 The Six Wives of Henry VIII (London: Weidenfeld and Nicolson, 1996); Orion, 1999, .
 Rpt. & updated edition, London: Weidenfeld and Nicolson, 2007.
 Also published as the Orion audio-book The Six Wives of Henry VIII (November 2006); .
 The first paperback edition is The Six Wives of Henry VIII (London: Mandarin, 1993); .
 The 1st American edition is entitled The Wives of Henry VIII.  New York: Knopf, 1992; .
 The Gunpowder Plot: Terror and Faith in 1605 (1996)
 Also published as Faith and Treason: The Gunpowder Plot; .
 Marie Antoinette (2001); 
 Also published with the subtitle Marie Antoinette: The Journey, (2002); .
 Love and Louis XIV: The Women in the Life of the Sun King (2006); .
 Must You Go? My Life with Harold Pinter (2010), London: Weidenfeld & Nicolson (Orion Books); .
 1st U.S. edition, New York: Nan A. Talese/Doubleday; .
 1st paperback edition London: Phoenix, 2010; 
 Also published in audio & digital editions) - "Shortlisted for Galaxy National Book Awards: Non-Fiction Book of the Year 2010."
 Perilous Question: The Drama of the Great Reform Bill 1832 (2013); 
 My History. A Memoir of Growing Up (2015), New York:  Doubleday. 
 Our Israeli Diary: Of That Time, Of That Place (2017); 
 The King and the Catholics: The Fight for Rights, 1829 (2018); 
 The Case of the Married Woman: Caroline Norton: A 19th Century Heroine Who Wanted Justice for Women (2021); 
 The Antonia Fraser Collection (2013)

Historical fiction
 King Arthur and the Knights of the Round Table (1954)
 Robin Hood (1955)

Jemima Shore novels
 Quiet as a Nun (1977)
 The Wild Island (1978). Also published as Tartan Tragedy.
 A Splash of Red (1981)
 Cool Repentance (1982)
 Oxford Blood (1985)
 Jemima Shore's First Case (1986)
 Your Royal Hostage (1987)
 The Cavalier Case (1990)
 Jemima Shore at the Sunny Grave (1991)
 Political Death (1995)
 Quiet as a Nun / Tartan Tragedy / Splash of Red (omnibus) (2005)
 Jemima Shore on the Case (omnibus) (2006)

Editor
 Scottish Love Poems (1975)
 The Lives of the Kings and Queens of England (1975)
 Love Letters (1976)
 The Pleasure of Reading (1992)
 A Red Rose or A Satin Heart (2010)

See also
 Earl of Longford

Notes

Further reading

Biographies and profiles
 Gussow, Mel. "The Lady Is a Writer". The New York Times Magazine, 9 September 1984.
 "Our President in 1983/84 was: Lady Antonia Fraser" bio at Edinburgh Sir Walter Scott Club.
 Snowman, Daniel. "Lady Antonia Fraser". History Today 50.10 (October 2000): 26–28.
 Wroe, Nicholas. "Profile: The History Woman", The Guardian, 24 August 2002.

Interviews and articles
 Dougary, Ginny.  "Lady Antonia Fraser's Life Less Ordinary: In a Frank Interview, the Famed Writer Talks about Motherhood, Catholicism, Her Parents and Soulmate Harold Pinter". The Times, 5 July 2008.
 "Interviews: Antonia Fraser Peers into the Heart of Louis XIV". National Public Radio, Weekend Edition Saturday, 11 November 2006.
 Leith, Sam.  "Literary Lazing". The Daily Telegraph, 10 July 2007.
 Talese, Nan A.  Interview with Antonia Fraser. Random House Books, 2001.
 Weinberg, Kate. "Culture Clinic: Lady Antonia Fraser". The Daily Telegraph. 15 Mar. 2008.

External links
 AntoniaFraser.com – Official website of Antonia Fraser.
 "Antonia Fraser" – Author webpage at Orion Publishing Group (UK publisher)
 "Antonia Fraser" – Author webpage at Random House (US publisher)
 Antonia Fraser – Client page at Curtis Brown Literary and Talent Agency
 "Antonia's Choice" – In Desert Island Discs on BBC Radio 4 (first broadcast 27 July 2008)
 Must You Go? extract – "First Night" (Chapter One), Galaxy National Book Awards (Phoenix edn)
 Translated Penguin Book – at  Penguin First Editions reference site of early first edition Penguin Books.

1932 births
Living people
Antonia
20th-century English biographers
20th-century English historians
20th-century English novelists
20th-century English women writers
21st-century English biographers
21st-century English historians
21st-century English memoirists
21st-century English novelists
21st-century English women writers
Alumni of Lady Margaret Hall, Oxford
British debutantes
British women historians
Converts to Roman Catholicism
Dames Commander of the Order of the British Empire
English Roman Catholics
English women novelists
Fellows of Lady Margaret Hall, Oxford
Fellows of the Royal Society of Literature
Harold Pinter
James Tait Black Memorial Prize recipients
Members of the Detection Club
Members of the Order of the Companions of Honour
People educated at St Mary's School, Ascot
People educated at The Dragon School
Wives of knights
Women biographers
Women historical novelists
Women mystery writers
Writers from London
Fraser, Lady Antonia
Presidents of the English Centre of PEN